John Parrish may refer to:

John Parrish (baseball) (born 1977), American baseball player
John W. Parrish (born 1939), American academic

See also
John Parish (disambiguation)